Loca is the first mini-album released by Japanese singer-songwriter Tomomi Itano. It was released in Japan on King Records on October 16, 2019. It was released in two versions: a limited CD+DVD edition and a regular CD edition. No physical singles were released from Loca, making it Itano's first album without any singles.

Release and sales
The album received criticism that its title track plagiarized "Señorita" by Shawn Mendes and Camila Cabello. The album sold poorly, selling about 2,000 copies before promotion campaigns for the album were abruptly halted.

Track listing

References

2019 albums
Albums by Japanese artists
Tomomi Itano albums